Davies Mwape (born 5 December 1986) is a Zambian football striker. He has played for clubs in Zambia, South Africa, Tanzania and Egypt.

Playing career
Mwape was born in Kitwe, Mwape began playing club football for local side Chambishi F.C. After two seasons with the senior side, he moved to South Africa to play for Orlando Pirates. He joined FC AK the following season. A spell with Jomo Cosmos followed.

Mwape returned to Zambia to play for Zanaco F.C. and Konkola Blades F.C. before moving to Tanzania to play for Young Africans S.C.

Mwape has made several appearances for the senior Zambia national football team, including three FIFA World Cup qualifying matches, and he participated in the 2005 COSAFA Cup.

The former Chipolopolo striker, who last played for the national soccer team on 3 September 2005, signed a contract with the Egyptian Premier league side Petrojet Suez Football Club on 7 October 2013. Mwape's contract clause has no market valuation and contract period.

References

External links

1986 births
Living people
People from Kitwe
Zambian footballers
Zambia international footballers
Orlando Pirates F.C. players
F.C. AK players
Jomo Cosmos F.C. players
Zanaco F.C. players
Konkola Blades F.C. players
Young Africans S.C. players
Roan United F.C. players
Petrojet SC players
NAPSA Stars F.C. players
Association football forwards
Zambian expatriate footballers
Expatriate soccer players in South Africa
Zambian expatriate sportspeople in South Africa
Expatriate footballers in Tanzania
Zambian expatriate sportspeople in Tanzania
Expatriate footballers in Egypt
Zambian expatriate sportspeople in Egypt
Tanzanian Premier League players